The Public Prosecution Service for Northern Ireland (PPSNI) is the department of the Northern Ireland Executive responsible for public prosecutions of people charged with criminal offences in Northern Ireland.  It is headed by the Director of Public Prosecutions for Northern Ireland. Its role is similar to that of the longer-established Crown Office and Procurator Fiscal Service in Scotland, and the Crown Prosecution Service in England and Wales. The PPSNI employs 50 Public Prosecutors and over 100 administrative staff.

The Police Service of Northern Ireland investigate crimes.  The PPSNI advise the police on possible prosecutions, authorise charge, review cases submitted by the police, prepare for and present cases in court.

It was established by the Justice (Northern Ireland) Act 2002.  Prior to its establishment the police themselves would prosecute most offences, with some being referred to the former Department of the Director of Public Prosecutions.

The Director of Public Prosecutions for Northern Ireland is appointed by the Attorney General for Northern Ireland.

See also
List of Government departments and agencies in Northern Ireland
Director of Public Prosecutions (around the world)

References

External links
Official website

Law of Northern Ireland
Prosecution services of the United Kingdom
Government of Northern Ireland